Saint Mark Parish may refer to:

Saint Mark Parish, Dominica
Saint Mark Parish, Grenada

Civil parishes in the Caribbean
Parish name disambiguation pages